Inverbeg is a settlement in Argyll and Bute, Scotland.  Its Ordnance Survey grid reference is NS3497.

It is on the western shore of Loch Lomond. There has at times been a pedestrian ferry to Rowardennan on the opposite side of the loch.  It is at the foot of Glen Douglas.

References

Hamlets in Argyll and Bute